is a 1966 Japanese New Wave film directed by Hiroshi Teshigahara and based on the 1964 novel of the same name written by Kōbō Abe. The story follows engineer Okuyama, who suffers severe facial burns in a work-related accident and is given a new face in the form of a lifelike mask.

Plot
Engineer Okuyama's face was disfigured by an explosion in an industrial accident, and wears bandages to cover the burns. Feeling isolated and being physically rejected by his wife, he consults a psychiatrist. Seeing the frustration Mr. Okuyama experiences with his facial disfiguration, the psychiatrist proposes to make an experimental prosthetic mask for him, apparently with great reluctance.

The psychiatrist and Okuyama offer a man 10,000 yen to serve as the model for the mask, and the mask is built and fitted onto Okuyama. The psychiatrist demands that Okuyama regularly reports his sensations and thoughts to him, and cautions Okuyama that the mask may change his behavior and personality so much that he will cease to be the same person. Okuyama tells no one that he has received the mask, and simply lives as a new man, telling his wife that he is traveling on business while he rents an apartment nearby. He tests the mask's effectiveness on a secretary of his company, who doesn't recognize him, and a mentally challenged neighborhood girl, who does. During a meeting between Okuyama and the psychiatrist, the latter realizes that his patient has already changed, and imagines a world where the mask goes into mass production, subsequently eliminating all sense of morality.

Okuyama decides to seduce his wife using his new identity. When he obtains this too easily, full of rage, he reveals himself to her, who in turn says she had known about his true identity from the first moment. He tries to persuade her to give their relation another chance, but she rejects him. Later, Okuyama attempts to rape a woman on the street, claiming to be nobody when arrested. He is freed thanks to his psychiatrist whose business card the police found in Okuyama's pocket, testifying that Okuyama is his patient and that he is not violent. While walking the nightly streets together, we see that everyone on the street is wearing a mask. At first the psychiatrist asks Okuyama for the mask back, then lets him keep it as he is a free man. While shaking hands to say goodbye, Okuyama stabs him to death.

Interleaved throughout the film is a separate tale (present in Abe's original novel in the form of a movie the protagonist watches at a cinema and then recounts) of a young woman whose otherwise beautiful face suffered a severe disfigurement on the right cheek and right side of the neck. She works in a psychiatric ward, whose inmates include many World War II veterans, and lives with her brother. The imagery of these sequences, her repeated worry about the coming of another war, and her asking her brother if he still remembers the sea at Nagasaki (presumably from their childhood there), all suggest that her scars came as a result of the atomic bombing of that city. Like Okuyama, she feels isolated because of her disfigurement.

Cast 
 Tatsuya Nakadai as Mr. Okuyama
 Machiko Kyō as Mrs. Okuyama
 Mikijirō Hira as Psychiatrist
 Kyōko Kishida as Nurse Kyoko
 Eiji Okada as The Boss
 Minoru Chiaki as Apartment Superintendent
 Hideo Kanze as Male Patient
 Kunie Tanaka as Patient at Mental Hospital
 Etsuko Ichihara as Yo-Yo Girl
Bibari Maeda as Singer in Bar
 Miki Irie as Girl with Scar
 Eiko Muramatsu as Secretary
 Yoshie Minami as Old Lady
 Hisashi Igawa as Man with Mole
 Kakuya Saeki as Elder Brother of Girl with Scar

Themes

The film uses several doublings of shots, both by repeating shots verbatim and by placing the main character in nearly identical shots twice. The most obvious example is in Okuyama's two separate rentals of apartments, once masked, and once with his new face. These doublings highlight Okuyama's double existence.

Production

One recurring image is the large and small severed ears which appear in the scenery in several scenes. These ears were designed and sculpted by Japanese sculptor Tomio Miki.

Hira's office, a strange blank space with glass partitions, was designed by architect Arata Isozaki, a friend of Teshigahara's. The glass walls are painted with Langer's lines and Leonardo da Vinci's Vitruvian Man.

Release
The Face of Another had a roadshow on July 15, 1966, in Japan, where it was distributed by Toho. The film received general release in Japan on September 23, 1967.

In the United States, the film received a theatrical release on June 9, 1967. It was re-issued in the US in May 1975 by Rising Sun and Toho.

Reception
The Face of Another was not well received outside of Japan, with audiences and critics largely feeling that it did not live up to Teshigahara's earlier film The Woman in the Dunes. Although it was successful in Japan, the film was a critical and financial failure internationally.

Vincent Canby of The New York Times wrote in 1974, "As fiction it's too fanciful to be seriously compelling and too glib to be especially thought-provoking." Still in 2008, film scholar Alexander Jacoby called it "a flawed fantasy" whose interesting theme suffers from the protagonist's "bland characterization". The film has since improved its critical standing. Jonathan Rosenbaum of the Chicago Reader defended the film in his 2005 review, calling it "more palatable" than Teshigahara's previous works, the theme "brilliantly and imaginatively explored", and the acting "potent".

Awards
The Face of Another received two Mainichi Film Awards for Best Art Direction and Best Film Score. It also won two prizes at the 1966 Faro Island Film Festival, FIPRESCI Prize for Teshigahara and Best Screenplay for Abe, and was nominated for Best Film and Best Actor.

References

External links
 
 
 
 
 
 

1966 films
1966 drama films
Japanese black-and-white films
Japanese avant-garde and experimental films
Japanese science fiction films
1960s avant-garde and experimental films
1960s psychological thriller films
1960s science fiction drama films
Films based on science fiction novels
Films directed by Hiroshi Teshigahara
Works about plastic surgery
Films scored by Toru Takemitsu
1960s Japanese films